The Crew is a 2000 American black comedy crime film directed by Michael Dinner and starring Burt Reynolds, Seymour Cassel, Richard Dreyfuss, Dan Hedaya, Carrie-Anne Moss, Jeremy Piven and Jennifer Tilly. Barry Sonnenfeld was one of the film's producers. The film is about four retired mobsters doing one last crime against a drug lord. It was released on August 25, 2000. The Crew garnered negative reviews and was a box-office bomb, grossing $13.1 million against a $38 million budget.

Plot
Four retired mobsters Bobby - the straight man leader, Bats - a cantankerous man with a short fuse and a pacemaker, Mouth - a silent ladies man many years past his prime, and Brick - a nice but dimwitted man plan one last crime to save their apartment at a retirement home (the owners are forcing them out with a rent increase so that the apartments can be rented to young, affluent South Beach couples). The four steal a corpse from the mortuary to use as the "victim" in a staged murder scene. Unknown to them, the body was that of Luis Ventanna, the head of a Colombian drug smuggling ring. As a result of the "murder", many of the young renters leave and the four men are given cash and a rent discount by the complex to keep living there. Much of this money is spent on high living and women, which causes a young stripper, Ferris to discover that the four men staged the murder - while spending time with the normally-silent "Mouth," he reveals that his mouth is loosened by intimacy with women.

To keep the woman quiet, the four agree to kill her stepmother, but instead kidnap her and fake her death by setting fire to her mansion. In the process, they accidentally burn down the house of the drug-smuggler's son, who happened to live in a nearby mansion. Believing that someone is trying to usurp his power, the drug lord offers $100,000 to anyone who brings him the head of the man responsible. This results in a confrontation at the apartment, leading to the capture of a female police officer and her partner, one of the wiseguys, the young woman, and the stepmother. The other wiseguys manage to escape this conflict, and track down the men who kidnapped their friend.

They call in all of their still-living former associates from their active years and lay siege to the ship where the drug lord is holding his prisoners.  They then turn the ship and the drug smugglers over to the police, along with a shipment of drugs. A truckload of Cuban cigars is taken by the men and used to make their apartment complex into "a retirement home for old wiseguys who are down on their luck."

A sub-plot of the movie involves Bobby's search for his long lost daughter, whom he hasn't seen since he was in his 30s and she was a small child.

Cast
 Richard Dreyfuss as Bobby Bartellemeo 
 Casey Siemaszko as Young Bobby Bartellemeo
 Burt Reynolds as Joey "Bats" Pistella
 Matthew Borlenghi as Young Joey "Bats" Pistella 
 Dan Hedaya as Mike "The Brick" Donatelli 
 Jeremy Ratchford as Young Mike "The Brick" Donatelli
 Seymour Cassel as Tony "Mouth" Donato
 Billy Jayne as Young Tony "Mouth" Donato
 Carrie-Anne Moss as Detective Olivia Neal
 Samantha Kurzman as Young Olivia Neal
 Jeremy Piven as Detective Steve Menteer
 Jennifer Tilly as Maureen "Ferris" Lowenstein 
 Lainie Kazan as Pepper Lowenstein 
 Miguel Sandoval as Raul Ventana
 Jose Zuniga as Escobar
 Mike Moroff as Jorge 
 Carlos Gomez as Miguel 
 Louis Lombardi, Jr. as Jimmy "Whistles"
 Frank Vincent as Marty
 Louis Guss as Jerry "The Hammer" Fungo

Reception
The Crew received negative reviews upon release, and was mostly noted for its similarities to Space Cowboys, which also involved four retirees who return for one last job (in that case, to go back into space). The website's critical consensus states: "Though the four actors are good together, the jokes are stale and not funny." On Metacritic, the film has an average score of 37 out of 100, based on 28 critics, indicating "generally unfavorable reviews".

Roger Ebert criticized the film for having an unbelievable premise with "desperate" slapstick and aggression, and characters that lack chemistry and individualism compared to the "heft and dimension" the main cast of Space Cowboys had, saying that "The Crew unfolds as a construction, not a series of surprises and delights." A. O. Scott of The New York Times commended Dreyfuss and Hedaya for their performances and Fanaro's script for having an "inspired set piece" and "pretty funny" jabs at "ethnic stereotypes", but wrote that: "The Crew is cobbled together in desperate obedience to the widespread Hollywood fallacy that the more plot a movie has, the more people will like it." Entertainment Weeklys Lisa Schwarzbaum gave the film a D grade, highlighting the script's "stereotyping" of its main leads, saying "[E]ach man's shtick swells into a frenzy of overacting in the name of aging that should have died with The Golden Girls."

It was a box office flop, grossing only US$13 million off an estimated $38 million budget.

References

External links

2000 films
2000 black comedy films
2000 comedy films
2000 crime films
2000s American films
2000s crime comedy films
2000s English-language films
American black comedy films
American crime comedy films
Columbia Pictures films
Films directed by Michael Dinner
Films produced by Barry Sonnenfeld
Films scored by Steve Bartek
Films set in 1968
Films set in 2000
Films set in Miami
Films set in New Jersey
Touchstone Pictures films